Kathy Halbreich (born 1949) is an American art curator and museum director.

Halbreich was born to Betty Stoll and Sonny Halbreich in 1949. She earned her BA from Bennington College. She was director of the Albert and Vera List Visual Arts Center at MIT, where she designed a new arts building with architect I.M. Pei. She was then the curator of contemporary art at the Museum of Fine Arts, Boston.

In 1991, Halbreich was hired as director of the Walker Art Center. Under her leadership, the museum broadened its reputation for developing emerging talent, hosting avant-garde performances and exhibitions. She oversaw a $73.8 million expansion at the Walker and announced her retirement in 2007. She was hired as an associate director of the Museum of Modern Art in 2008. At MoMA, Halbreich curated a 2014 retrospective of German artist Sigmar Polke and a 2018 Bruce Nauman exhibition.

In September, 2017 Halbreich was appointed director of the Robert Rauschenberg Foundation.

References

1949 births
Living people
American art curators
American women curators
American people of German-Jewish descent
Bennington College alumni
People associated with the Museum of Modern Art (New York City)